The fifth and final season of The Fosters premiered on July 11, 2017. The season consisted of 22 episodes and stars Teri Polo and Sherri Saum as Stef Foster and Lena Adams, an interracial lesbian couple, who have adopted a girl (Maia Mitchell) and her younger brother (Hayden Byerly) while also trying to juggle raising Latino twin teenagers (Cierra Ramirez and Noah Centineo) and Stef's biological son (David Lambert). Danny Nucci also returns as Mike Foster in a recurring role.

Cast

Main cast
 Teri Polo as Stef Adams Foster
 Sherri Saum as Lena Adams Foster
 Hayden Byerly as Jude Adams Foster
 Noah Centineo as Jesus Adams Foster
 David Lambert as Brandon Foster
 Maia Mitchell as Callie Adams Foster
 Danny Nucci as Mike Foster1
 Cierra Ramirez as Mariana Adams Foster
: Danny Nucci is only credited as a series regular for the episodes he appears in.

Recurring cast
 Elliot Fletcher as Aaron Baker
 Kalama Epstein as Noah 
 Amanda Leighton as Emma
 Annika Marks as Monte Porter
 Izabela Vidovic as Taylor Shaw
 Lisseth Chavez as Ximena Sinfuego 
 Nandy Martin as Poppy Sinfuego
 Meg DeLacy as Grace Mullen
 Nia Peeples as Susan Mullen
 Tom Williamson as AJ Hensdale
 Jordan Rodrigues as Mat Tan
 Alex Saxon as Wyatt
 Christopher Meyer as Logan Bayfield
 Kristen Ariza as Tess Bayfield
 Reggie Austin as Dean Bayfield
 Jared Ward as Drew Turner
 Denyse Tontz as Cortney Strathmore
 Brandon Quinn as Gabriel Duncroft
 Alexandra Barreto as Ana Gutierrez
 Alex Skuby as Joe Gray
 Tyler Alvarez as Declan Rivers
 Nick Fink as Shawn
 Abigail Cowen as Eliza Hunter
Beau Mirchoff as Jamie Hunter
Robert Gant as Jim Hunter
Susan Walters as Diane Hunter
Spencer List as Carter Hunter
Dallas Young as Corey

Guest cast
 Annie Potts as Sharon Elkin
 Lorraine Toussaint as Dana Adams
 Bruce Davison as Stuart Adams
 Kerr Smith as Robert Quinn
 Marlene Forte as Elena Gutierrez
 Tony Plana as Victor Gutierrez
 Jamie McShane as Donald Jacob
 Adam Irigoyen as Kyle Snow
 Louis Hunter as Nick Stratos
 Suzanne Cryer as Jenna Paul
 Madisen Beaty as Talya Banks
 Daffany Clark as Daphne Keene
 Chad Todhunter as Patrick Molloy
 Hope Olaidé Wilson as Diamond
 Mark Totty as Craig Stratos
 Jay Ali as Timothy
 Tom Phelan as Cole

Episodes

References

2017 American television seasons
2018 American television seasons
The Fosters (American TV series)